Malovăț is a commune located in Mehedinți County, Oltenia, Romania. It is composed of seven villages: 23 August, Bârda, Bobaița, Colibași, Lazu, Malovăț and Negrești.

Notable people
Ecaterina Andronescu (1948–), scientist and politician
Virgil Bărbuceanu (1927–2004), equestrian who competed at the 1956 and 1960 Summer Olympics 
Dumitru Berciu (1907–1998), historian and archaeologist
Dumitru Ghiață (1888–1972), painter
Baba Anujka

References

Communes in Mehedinți County
Localities in Oltenia